The Men's +105 kg weightlifting competitions at the 2016 Summer Olympics in Rio de Janeiro took place on 16 August at the Pavilion 2 of Riocentro.

Schedule
All times are Time in Brazil (UTC-03:00)

Records
Prior to this competition, the existing world and Olympic records were as follows.

Results

New records

References

Weightlifting at the 2016 Summer Olympics
Men's events at the 2016 Summer Olympics